Roelof Frankot (25 October 1911, in Meppel – 1 December 1984, in Heeten) was a Dutch painter.

Frankot studied photography. In 1930, he started painting. He later had a strong relation with the CoBrA movement, and his artworks are quite similar to some of the art from the CoBrA movement. They are very abstract and spontaneous paintings in strong colours. Oil on canvas was his preferred medium. Publications with his art were occasionally accompanied by small poems that he wrote himself. Frankot has been considered an innovator of Dutch art with all its great traditions. Frankot died at the age of 73 from cancer.

Frankot's work was included in the 1939 exhibition and sale Onze Kunst van Heden (Our Art of Today) at the Rijksmuseum in Amsterdam.

During his career Frankot made a huge number of exhibitions in Europe, the United States and Latin America.

Representations 
Frankot is represented in private collections in many countries, especially in Britain, France and the Netherlands, and among others, the following institutions:

Stedelijk Museum, Amsterdam, Netherlands
Ministry of Education, Arts and Sciences, The Hague, Netherlands
Sandberg Collection, Amsterdam
Municipal Museum, Haag
Britto Collection, Brazilia
Dansk Arkitekt- & Ingeniørkontor, Silkeborg, Denmark
Niepoort & Co., Aarhus, Denmark
University of Aarhus, Denmark
Drents Museum, Assen, the Netherlands
Haags Gemeentemuseum, The Hague, the Netherlands

Literature published about Roelof Frankot 
Scheen (1969); H. Redeker en M. van Beek, Van Cobra tot Zero (Venlo 1982)
Frankot, Roelof/Roding, M. Roelof Frankot. Schilderijen en tekeningen 1911-1984
Assen, Drents Museum, 1990, pap./softcover, 64 p. Dutch Roel H.Smit-Mulder, “Staphorst
Roel H.Smit-Mulder, “Staphorst verbeeld. Toen en nu”, (Zwolle, 2000) 41

References

References: “Frankot” released by Galerie Moderne, Silkeborg, Denmark 1967

1911 births
1984 deaths
People from Meppel
Dutch photographers
20th-century Dutch painters
Dutch male painters
20th-century Dutch male artists